Puccinellia macquariensis is a species of salt-tolerant, perennial, tufted grass in the family Poaceae.  It is endemic to Australia's subantarctic Macquarie Island in the Southern Ocean, though very closely related to P. chathamica of New Zealand's southern offshore islands.  It grows to between 4 and 25 cm in height and is common in dense patches on coastal cliffs and stacks.  It flowers from November to June.

References

Notes

Sources
 
 

macquariensis
Flora of Macquarie Island
Plants described in 1939